In insurance, co-insurance or coinsurance is the splitting or spreading of risk among multiple parties.

In the United States
In the U.S. insurance market, co-insurance is the joint assumption of risk between the insurer and the insured. In title insurance, it also means the sharing of risks between two or more title insurance companies.

In health insurance
In health insurance, copayment is fixed while co-insurance is the percentage that the insured pays after the insurance policy's deductible is exceeded, up to the policy's stop loss. It can be expressed as a pair of percentages with the insurer's portion stated first, or just a single percentage showing what the insured pays. Once the insured's out-of-pocket expenses equal the stop loss, the insurer will assume responsibility for 100% of any additional costs. 70–30, 80–20, and 90–10 insurer-insured co-insurance schemes are common, with stop loss limits of $1,000 to $3,000 after which the insurer covers all expenses.

In property insurance

Co-insurance is a penalty imposed on the insured by the insurance carrier for underinsuring the value of the tangible property. The penalty is based on a percentage stated within the policy and the amount underreported.

In title insurance
Owner's title insurance policy forms of the American Land Title Association created between 1987 and late 2006, contain co-insurance clauses. For partial losses, they require the insured carry a percentage of the risk of loss in two circumstances. The first is if the insured did not insure its title for at least 80% of its market value at the time the policy was issued. In that case, the insurer will pay only 80% of the loss. The second is if improvements constructed on the property after the policy is issued increase the property's value by at least 20% above the amount of the policy. In that case, the insurer will pay a percentage of the claim equal to the ratio of 120% of the amount of insurance purchased divided by the sum of the amount of insurance and the cost of the improvements.

Co-insurance is also used among U.S. domestic title insurers in a manner similar to that described below for the international insurance market.

In other insurance
In some cases, including employer's liability insurance, co-insurance percent denotes a function analogous to the copay function that it has in health insurance, in which the insured covers a certain percentage of the losses up to a certain level.

In business income interruption insurance, a type of time-element insurance, the co-insurance percent indicates how long the coverage will last, and can range from 50% to 125%. The former co-insurance allows for 6 months of coverage, compared to 15 months for 125%.

See also
 Cost sharing

References

External links
 Insurance to Value from the Casualty Actuarial Society

Insurance